Club Europa de Nava is a Spanish football club based in Nava, in the autonomous community of Asturias.

History
Founded in 1940, Europa promoted to Tercera División after 40 years competing, in 1980. During this golden era, with the club participating in 11 of the 13 editions of Tercera División until 1993, the club also played one edition of the Copa del Rey, being eliminated in the first round, despite achieving one draw against regional powerhouse Real Oviedo.

From 2009 to 2012, during the club's decline, Europa had a reserve team that promoted to a higher division than the main team.

Season to season

12 seasons in Tercera División

References

External links
Facebook account
Twitter account

Football clubs in Asturias
Association football clubs established in 1940
1940 establishments in Spain